Juan Sebastián Silva Martínez, commonly known as Sebastián Silva, is a Colombian internet personality, vlogger, actor, presenter and singer. He is best known for playing the roles of Pite in The Queen of Flow (2018), and Rubén in Club 57 (2019). He studied cinema and television at the National University of Colombia.

Filmography

Awards and nominations

References

External links 
 

Living people
Spanish-language YouTubers
Colombian male telenovela actors
21st-century Colombian male actors
21st-century Colombian male singers
Colombian YouTubers
1993 births